Hemicythara angicostata is a species of sea snail, a marine gastropod mollusc in the family Mangeliidae.

Description
The length of the shell attains 6 mm.
 
The shell is turreted. The whorls are distinctly shouldered, with a few distant small longitudinal ribs, extending to the suture, and much wider interspaces. The color of the shell is light yellowish brown to white. The columella is chocolate tinged, often with a narrow interrupted chocolate central line.

Distribution
This marine species occurs off Taiwan and New Caledonia.

References

External links
  Tucker, J.K. 2004 Catalog of recent and fossil turrids (Mollusca: Gastropoda). Zootaxa 682:1–1295.

angicostata
Gastropods described in 1846